The Fluid Dynamics Prize is a prize that has been awarded annually by the American Physical Society (APS) since 1979. The recipient is chosen for "outstanding achievement in fluid dynamics research". In 2004, the Otto Laporte Award—another APS award on fluid dynamics—was merged into the Fluid Dynamics Prize.

Recipients
The Fluid Dynamics Prize has been awarded to:

 2021: 
 2020: Katepalli Sreenivasan
 2019: Alexander Smits
 2018: Keith Moffatt
 2017: Detlef Lohse
 2016: Howard A. Stone
 2015: Morteza Gharib
 2014: Geneviève Comte-Bellot
 2013: Elaine Surick Oran
 2012: John F. Brady
 2011: Tony Maxworthy
 2010: E. John Hinch
 2009: Stephen B. Pope
 2008: 
 2007: 
 2006: Thomas S. Lundgren
 2005: Ronald J. Adrian
 2004: 
 2003: 
 2002: Gary Leal
 2001: Howard Brenner
 2000: 
 1999: Daniel D. Joseph
 1998: Fazle Hussain
 1997: Louis Norberg Howard
 1996: Parviz Moin
 1995: Harry L Swinney
 1994: Stephen H. Davis
 1993: Theodore Yao-tsu Wu
 1992: William R. Sears
 1991: Andreas Acrivos
 1990: John L. Lumley
 1989: 
 1988: 
 1987: Anatol Roshko
 1986: Robert T. Jones
 1985: Chia-Shun Yih
 1984: George Carrier
 1983: Stanley Corrsin
 1982: Howard W. Emmons
 1981: 
 1980: Hans Wolfgang Liepmann
 1979: Chia Chiao Lin

See also
 List of physics awards

References

External links
 Fluid Dynamics Prize, American Physical Society

Fluid dynamics
Awards established in 1979
Awards of the American Physical Society